Hungry Eyes is a 1918 American silent Western film directed by Rupert Julian and starring Monroe Salisbury, Ruth Clifford and Gretchen Lederer.

Cast
 Rupert Julian as John Silver
 Monroe Salisbury as Dale Revenal
 Ruth Clifford as Mary Jane Appleton
 W.H. Bainbridge as Dudley Appleton
 Henry A. Barrows as Jack Nelda 
 Arthur Tavares as Scotty
 Gretchen Lederer as Bessie Dupont
 George A. McDaniel as Pinto Dupont
 Rita Pickering as Nellie

References

Bibliography
 James Robert Parish & Michael R. Pitts. Film directors: a guide to their American films. Scarecrow Press, 1974.

External links
 

1918 films
1918 Western (genre) films
American black-and-white films
Universal Pictures films
Films directed by Rupert Julian
Silent American Western (genre) films
1910s English-language films
1910s American films